Farah N. Louis is an American politician. She is a member of the Democratic Party and is a member of the New York City Council for the 45th district, which includes the Brooklyn neighborhoods of East Flatbush, Flatbush, Flatlands, Marine Park, and Midwood.

Early life and education
Both of Louis's parents immigrated from Haiti, her mother worked in the healthcare field and her father as a law enforcement professional and later a yellow cab driver.

Louis attended Midwood High School, Long Island University for a BA in English, and received an MPA from New York University's Robert F. Wagner Graduate School of Public Service.

Career
Louis worked as a mental healthcare provider for eight years, then worked in Jumaane Williams' New York City Council office, first as director of community outreach, then as deputy chief of staff. She worked in Williams' office for six years and was still in that role when he was elected New York City Public Advocate, creating the vacancy Louis would be then elected to. Williams did not endorse Louis, but another challenger for the District 45 seat who also worked in his Council office, Monique Chandler-Waterman.

Louis won her Council seat in a special election on May 14, 2019, in a low-turnout election. She finished with 3,861 votes, a plurality of 41.81%, ahead of second-place Chandler-Waterman who finished with 2,790 votes cast (30.21%). She officially took office after being sworn in on June 13, 2019. As a result of New York laws, another special election was held to determine if she will serve the remainder of Williams' four-year term ending December 31, 2021. She won the June 25, 2019, Democratic primary 51.69% to Chandler-Waterman's 41.36%. On November 5, 2019, Louis won the general election gaining 93.1% to Anthony Beckford's 4.7%.

Electoral history

References

External links

New York City Council members
New York (state) Democrats
Living people
American politicians of Haitian descent
Long Island University alumni
New York University alumni
21st-century American politicians
African-American New York City Council members
Women New York City Council members
21st-century American women politicians
1983 births
21st-century African-American women
21st-century African-American politicians
20th-century African-American people
20th-century African-American women